The Heller, abbreviation hlr, was a coin, originally valued at half a pfennig, that was issued in Switzerland and states of the Holy Roman Empire, surviving in some European countries until the 20th century.

It was first recorded in 1200 or 1208 or, according to Reiner Hausherr as early as 1189. The hellers were gradually so debased that they were no long silver coins. There were 576 hellers in a Reichsthaler ("imperial thaler"). After the Second World War, hellers only survived in Czechoslovakia and Hungary.

Name 
The Heller, also called the Haller or Häller, in Latin sources: denarius hallensis or hallensis denarius, took its name from the city of Hall am Kocher (today Schwäbisch Hall). Silver coins stamped on both sides (Häller Pfennige) were called Händelheller because they usually depicted a hand. A distinction was made between white, red and black hellers.

Germany

Overview 
Mints produced the coin from the beginning of the 13th century, based on a previously produced silver pfennig (Häller Pfennig, sometimes called Händelheller for its depiction of a hand on the front face), but its composition deteriorated with the mixing in copper little by little so that it was no longer considered to be a silver coin. There were red, white and black Hellers. Beginning in the Middle Ages it became a symbol of low worth, and a common German byword is "keinen (roten) Heller wert", lit.: not worth a (red) Heller, or "not worth a red cent".

The term Heller came into wide use as a name for coins of small value throughout many of the German states up to 1873 when, after German unification, Bismarck's administration introduced the Mark and the pfennig as coinage throughout the German Empire.

History 
In Swabia the Heller originally corresponded to the Pfennig, so that there were 240 Heller in a Charlemagne pound. However, by an imperial edict of 1385, the value of the Heller was halved, resulting in 8 Hellers = 4 Pfennigs = 1 Kreuzer and 4 Kreuzer = 1 Batzen

Due to the low value and the non-standard quality of these coins, it was common in the High and Late Middle Ages to weigh large amounts of Hellers and to transact business based on the total coin weight; this often resulted in purchase amounts in "pound hellers", which did not necessarily correspond to the Charlemagne at 240 hellers.

In what was then Bohemian Upper Lusatia, the cities Bautzen and Görlitz had the right to mint coins. In the 15th century they coined alternately every year. The Görlitz Heller (Katterfinken) was a coin whose silver content decreased more and more in later years.

For example, around 1490, the House of Wettin's silver pfennig currency was: 24 hellers = 12 pfennigs = 2 half Schwertpfennigs = 1 Spitzpfennig = 1 Bartpfennig or Zinspfennig. The hellers were hollow  and called Hohlhellers, similar to the Thuringian Hohlpfennigs.

In Electoral Saxony, low-value Besselpfennigs circulated as "invaders". They were referred to as Näpfchenheller in Saxon documents from 1668. In some areas of Saxony, for example in the Ore Mountains, they became a nuisance. The population preferred to throw the lower value Näpfchenhellers into the collection bag, which significantly reduced income from the collection. This led, for example, in Annaberg to the introduction of special church pfennigs (Kirchenpfennige).

In the Electorate of Hesse, the silver groschen was divided into 12 hellers, so that the heller was equal to the Prussian pfennig. Dreiheller were copper 1 pfennig pieces that were minted in Saxe-Gotha.

With the transition to a standard imperial currency of marks and pfennigs under the Coinage Act of 9 July 1873, the heller disappeared like all other old currency units (except for the simple Vereinstaler, which circulated until 1907). Only the last Bavarian Heller of the former guilder standard were still valid in Bavaria for a considerable time after 1878 as  pf coins of the new Goldmark imperial currency.

German East Africa 

The German heller was resurrected in 1904 when the government took over responsibility for the currency of German East Africa from the German East Africa Company. The heller was introduced as 1/100 of a rupie instead of the pesa, which had been a 1/64 of a rupie up to that time. 

In the 1920s the Heller currency was expanded to greater denominations in the German territories and printed bills were produced to represent their value for trade.

Austria-Hungary 
In Austria-Hungary, Heller was also the term used in the Austrian half of the empire for 1/100 of the Austro-Hungarian krone (the other being fillér in the Hungarian half), the currency from 1892 until after the demise (1918) of the Empire.

Czech Republic and Slovakia 
The term heller was also used for a coin valued at 1/100 of a koruna (crown) in the Czech Republic (Czech koruna) and Slovakia (Slovak koruna), as well as in former Czechoslovakia (Czechoslovak koruna).

Only the currency of the Czech Republic continues to use hellers (haléře), although they survive only as a means of calculation — the Czech National Bank removed the coins themselves from circulation in 2008 and notionally replaced them with rounding to the next koruna.

Liechtenstein 

In Liechtenstein, emergency money was in circulation from 1919 to 1924. The denominations were based on the heller.

Switzerland 

In the late Middle Ages, the haller was the lowest denomination coin in the area of the Swiss Confederation and corresponded to half a pfennig. From the 1320s, the first south German haller made its way to northern Switzerland, where it replaced the production of small, one-sided pfennigs, which were now known as haller.

This haller established itself as a basic unit in the city-state of Zurich and in the princely Abbey of St. Gallen from 1370 onwards. As the name of an increasingly devalued coin, the haller existed nominally until the end of the 18th century.

In culture  
Ein Heller und ein Batzen is a well-known student and soldier's song by Albert von Schlippenbach (lyrics) and Franz Kugler (music).

The German idiom Das ist keinen roten Heller wert – "that's not worth a red heller" – goes back to the coin's low value and means that something is worthless. Others include eine Schuld auf Heller und Pfennig begleichen ("to settle a debt to the last heller and pfennig" i.e. to settle a debt in full), seinen letzten Heller verlieren ("to lose your last heller") and keinen roten Heller haben ("to not have a red heller" i.e. penniless).

On the A 33 motorway north of the Wünnenberg-Haaren interchange is the motorway services station of Letzter Heller ("Last Heller"). In earlier times there was an inn nearby. After the residents of the surrounding villages had done their shopping in Paderborn and returned to their villages on foot, they paused halfway at the inn and "spent their last heller".

See also

 Scherf
 Coins of the Czech koruna
 Coins of the Slovak koruna
 Czechoslovak koruna
 Bohemian-Moravian koruna
 Øre (Subdivision of Scandinavian crowns)

References

Further reading 
 
 1Heller. In: Deutsches Rechtswörterbuch, Vol. V, col. 704–707.
 Heller. In: Schwäbisches Wörterbuch. Vol. III, col. 1409–1411
 Haller II. In: Schweizerisches Idiotikon, Vol. II, col. 1130 ff.

Numismatics
Currencies of Germany
Coins of the Holy Roman Empire
Medieval currencies
Early Modern currencies